Avati is a surname. Notable people with the surname include:

Pupi Avati (born 1938), Italian film director, producer, and screenwriter
Joe Avati (born 1974), Italian-Australian comedian
James Avati (1912–2005), American illustrator

See also
Avani (given name)